Carl Boardley (born 7 December 1975) is an English motor-racing driver, and four time National Hot Rods (oval racing) World Champion.

On 5 July 2009 he won the National Hot Rod World Championship for his fourth World title in a  row.

His younger brother Stuart is a former professional footballer.

Racing career

2013 - Ginetta GT Supercup
In 2013 Boardley contested the entire season of the Ginetta GT Supercup, with a Ginetta G55 entered under the banner of his own CBM Motorsport team. Boardley finished the season in 9th place with 316 points. His highest place finish was 3rd place at Thruxton.

2014 - Ginetta GT4 Supercup

For 2014, Boardley is being entered by JHR Developments, the winning team of 2013 champion and now BTCC driver Tom Ingram.

Racing record

Complete British Touring Car Championship results
(key) (Races in bold indicate pole position – 1 point awarded in first race; races in italics indicate fastest lap – 1 point awarded all races; * signifies that driver lead race for at least one lap – 1 point awarded all races)

References

English racing drivers
Living people
ASCAR drivers
British Touring Car Championship drivers
1975 births
Ginetta GT4 Supercup drivers

JHR Developments drivers